The National Philatelic Museum, in Philadelphia, Pennsylvania, was a short-lived not-for-profit organization intended to create awareness of and offer courses on philately.

The museum was the brainchild of Bernard Davis, a wealthy banker and avid stamp collector. The museum, at Broad and Diamond Streets in downtown Philadelphia, opened its doors on December 5, 1948.

The museum offered a variety of services, including presentation of exhibits in frames for public viewing and a philatelic library. The museum also hosted numerous philatelic exhibitions held by various philatelic societies. The National Philatelic Museum was unusual in that, in conjunction with nearby Temple University, it offered courses in philately through its Philatelic Institute.

The museum published a total of 36 Bulletins containing articles on various aspects of philately, including France, Airpost, Pan-American, Bavaria, Germany, New South Wales, Switzerland, Ben Franklin and the American Philatelic Congress.

The museum remained in existence for about ten years. In 1960, most of its material and equipment was transferred to the new Spellman Museum of Stamps & Postal History.

References

 Publications of the National Philatelic Museum, Philadelphia

Philatelic organizations based in the United States
Philatelic museums in the United States
Defunct museums in Pennsylvania
Museums established in 1948
Museums in Philadelphia
1948 establishments in Pennsylvania